Fanny Bornedal (born 24 July 2000) is a Danish actress. 
Fanny is the daughter of Ole Bornedal.

Filmography

References

External links

2000 births
Living people
Danish child actresses
Danish film actresses
Danish television actresses
Place of birth missing (living people)